Evan Sewell Wallace (November 1, 1982 – February 13, 2017) best known by his stage name E-Dubble, often stylized e-dubble, or shortened to e-dub, was an American rapper. He was best known for his Freestyle Friday series in which he released a new song each Friday throughout 2010, with one final unofficial release in 2012. He was the founder of Black Paisley Records. 

Throughout his career, E-Dubble released two studio albums, Hip Hop Is Good (2009), and Two Tone Rebel (2016); One studio EP Reset EP (2012); one collaborative EP with the band 27 Lights, Surrounded By Giants (2014); and one mixtape Straight Outta St. Mary's (2006).

Background 

Wallace grew up outside of Philadelphia, the youngest child of a principal and a schoolteacher. His mother was a schoolteacher and taught music. In the 1990s, Wallace and his friends fell under the spell of hip-hop cast by Snoop Dogg and Dr. Dre. He started rapping from the age of 8 but didn't gain mainstream success until later due to him being insecure about his rapping ability. His music would later be known for its common celebrations of his love for hip-hop. He played center on the Wissahickon High School basketball team but dreamed of being a professional rapper. In an interview with the Baltimore magazine, Wallace cited Eminem's breakout success in the late 90s as a major inspiration to him.

During his time in St. Mary's College of Maryland, Wallace and a fellow student called Skeltz joined a group called Irishtoothache composed mainly of students from the University of Maryland,  he made his first song with them in 2003, he continued making collaborative songs with them up until 2010.

Wallace graduated from St. Mary's College of Maryland with a degree in political science. The Straight Outta St. Mary's mixtape was released on April 12, 2006, and was written by E-Dubble and Glaze who were both members of Irishtoothache.

E-dubble moved to Baltimore to live with his friends and collaborators. Together they formed the hip-hop band Young English and played their first show in July 2008. The group went on to purchase a renovated warehouse, dubbed "The Hampden Mansion," where E-dubble would later go on to write, record, and produce his debut album Hip-Hop is Good, released on October 27, 2009. The next year, in August 2010, E-dubble created his YouTube channel. He went on to produce his Freestyle Friday series, a weekly series of free songs.

The first Freestyle Friday track—not true freestyle raps, but composed songs—was released on February 5, 2010, with a new song released every Friday until February 3, 2011. He also occasionally collaborated with his band Young English, to make some of his tracks. A final track, "Last Man Standing", was released in 2012. The series was noted for its effective use of samples, lyrics and E-dubble's spoken word outros, in which he communicated with listeners. The pressure of writing and recording a new song every week took its toll. 

Reset EP was released on November 6, 2012, was well-received by his fans and it focused on his recovery following the Freestyle Friday era He released his final album, "Two Tone Rebel", in 2016.

Death 

Wallace died of an infection that started in his hand and spread throughout his body on February 13, 2017. Sepsis was reported as the cause of death, but this was not confirmed. Wallace claimed that his illness caused him to "throw up half of his body's blood" and for "his hands to swell up." He also said that he had to have "10 blood transfusions." He is buried in the Abington Presbyterian Church.

References 

1982 births
2017 deaths
Deaths from sepsis
Rappers from Philadelphia